Wataru Misaka (December 21, 1923 – November 20, 2019) was an American  professional basketball player. A  point guard of Japanese descent, he broke a color barrier in professional basketball by being the first non-white player and the first player of Asian descent to play in the National Basketball Association (NBA), known then as the Basketball Association of America (BAA). 

Misaka played college basketball for the Utah Utes and led the team to win the 1944 NCAA and 1947 NIT championships. He took a two-year hiatus between these titles to serve in the United States Army in the American occupation of Japan. Misaka subsequently played three games for the New York Knicks during the 1947–48 season.

Early life
Misaka was born a Nisei (second-generation Japanese American) in Ogden, Utah, to Tatsuyo and Fusaichi Misaka. He grew up poor with his two younger brothers. His family lived in the basement of his father's barber shop between a bar and a pawn shop in a bad area on 25th Street, which was also rife with prostitution. He recalled the neighborhood as being a "ghetto".

Misaka was raised in an era of "virtual apartheid", wrote University of Utah magazine Continuum. Excluded from extracurricular activities, Nisei children played in their own baseball and basketball leagues. Misaka was not served in restaurants because of his ethnicity, and neighbors would cross the street to steer clear of him. Despite this, Misaka still participated in sports. Misaka attended Ogden High School, where he led the basketball team to a state championship title in 1940 and a regional championship title in 1941.

College career
After high school, Misaka continued his education at the same time that many other Japanese Americans were forced into internment camps. He attended Weber College, where he helped lead its basketball team to two championships. Misaka was named the Most Valuable Player of the 1942 junior college postseason tournament and, in 1943, he was named the Weber College athlete of the year.

Misaka subsequently enrolled at the University of Utah and joined their Utes basketball team. The young team finished with an 18–3 record in the 1943–44 season.  They were invited to both the NCAA tournament and the National Invitation Tournament (NIT). The team chose the latter because it was more prestigious at the time, and meant a trip to New York City. The team lost to Kentucky in the first round, but was given a chance to play in the NCAA tournament due to Arkansas's withdrawal because of a team accident. The team took advantage of this and won the tournament, winning the championship game over Dartmouth 42–40 in overtime.  Two nights later, Misaka and his team played the NIT champions, St. John's, in an exhibition match at Madison Square Garden, where his team won 43–36. Misaka was later drafted for World War II and rose to the rank of staff sergeant. After two years, he returned to the University of Utah and rejoined the team.  The team won their second national championship in four years.  Because of their success, Utah was invited to the NIT championship tournament in New York.  The team slid by the first two rounds before beating Kentucky 49–45 to capture the 1947 NIT championship title. Misaka held Wildcats All-American guard Ralph Beard to a single point.

On January 22, 2022, Misaka's number 20 jersey was honored by the Utah Utes.

Professional career
Misaka was selected by the New York Knicks in the 1947 BAA Draft. He debuted as the first non-Caucasian player in the BAA (later known as the NBA) in 1947, the same year that Jackie Robinson broke the baseball color line. The first African American did not play in the NBA until 1950. There were no press conferences or interviews to commemorate Misaka's first game. "It wasn't a big thing," he said. "Nobody cared."

Misaka played in three games and scored seven points in the 1947–48 season before being cut from the team mid-season. He believed he was cut because the Knicks had too many guards. Misaka said he did not feel any discrimination from teammates or opposing players during his time with the Knicks, but he did not mingle with everyone. During training camp, he was only close with future Hall-of-Famer Carl Braun.

Later years
Misaka declined an offer to play with the Harlem Globetrotters, and he returned home to earn a degree in engineering from Utah. "The salary for a rookie and the salary for starting engineer weren't much different", Misaka recalled. He then joined a company in Salt Lake City as an electrical engineer. He and his wife, Kate, had two children. Misaka died at the age of 95 on November 20, 2019 in Salt Lake City.

Legacy
Misaka was inducted into the Utah Sports Hall of Fame in 1999. In 2000, Misaka was featured in a landmark exhibit, More Than a Game: Sport in the Japanese American Community, at the Japanese American National Museum in Los Angeles. A documentary film, Transcending: The Wat Misaka Story by Bruce Alan Johnson and Christine Toy Johnson, premiered in 2008. It recounts Misaka's playing career and his status as the first non-Caucasian player in the NBA.

BAA career statistics

Regular season

See also

List of shortest players in National Basketball Association history
Race and ethnicity in the NBA

Footnotes

References

Further reading
'Wat' a player NBA.com. Retrieved April 7, 2005
Wat Misaka: an Asian basketball pioneer, Basketball Digest, Feb 2002 by Douglas Stark.
Basketball's Jackie Robinson ESPN Magazine May 2002 by Ursula Liang.
Breaking the Basketball Color Line 70 seasons ago Ozy media 2018 by Hugh Biggar.
Hoop pioneer Wat Misaka reflects on breaking barriers in an incredible life

External links

Transcending: The Wat Misaka Story film website

1923 births
2019 deaths
American electrical engineers
American men's basketball players
American military personnel of Japanese descent
American sportspeople of Japanese descent
Basketball players from Utah
Engineers from Utah
Junior college men's basketball players in the United States
Military personnel from Utah
New York Knicks draft picks
New York Knicks players
Point guards
Sportspeople from Ogden, Utah
Utah Utes men's basketball players
Weber State Wildcats men's basketball players